Gordon Edward Pinsent  (July 12, 1930 – February 25, 2023) was a Canadian actor, writer, director, and singer. He was known for his roles in numerous productions, including Away from Her, The Rowdyman, John and the Missus, A Gift to Last, Due South, The Red Green Show, and Quentin Durgens, M.P. He was the voice of Babar the Elephant in television and film from 1989 to 2015.

Early life
Pinsent, the youngest of six children, was born in Grand Falls, Newfoundland (present-day Newfoundland and Labrador, Canada). His mother, Florence "Flossie" (née Cooper), was originally from Clifton, Newfoundland and his father, Stephen Arthur Pinsent, was a papermill worker and cobbler originally from Dildo, Newfoundland. His mother was "quiet spoken" and a religious Anglican; the family was descended from immigrants from Kent and Devon in England. He was a self-described "awkward child" who suffered from rickets.

Pinsent began acting on stage in the 1940s at the age of 17. He soon took on roles in radio drama on the CBC, and later moved into television and film as well. In the early 1950s, he took a break from acting and joined the Canadian Army, serving for approximately four years as a private in the Royal Canadian Regiment.

Career
Pinsent's professional acting career began in 1957 at Winnipeg's Theatre 77 (later known as the Royal Manitoba Theatre Centre) under the direction of John Hirsch. In the years that followed, he performed in many theatrical productions in Winnipeg, Toronto and at the Stratford Festival.

In the early 1960s, he appeared in Scarlett Hill and The Forest Rangers. He later became a staple of Canadian television with roles including the series Quentin Durgens, M.P., A Gift to Last (which he created), The Red Green Show, Due South, Wind at My Back, and Power Play.

Pinsent's film roles include The Rowdyman, Who Has Seen the Wind, John and the Missus, The Shipping News and Away from Her. He wrote the screenplays for The Rowdyman and John and the Missus. Perhaps his best known early film role was that of the president of the United States in the 1970 science fiction cult classic Colossus: The Forbin Project.

In 1979 he was made an officer of the Order of Canada and was promoted to Companion in 1998. In 2006, he was made a Fellow of the Royal Society of Canada. In 2007, it was announced that Pinsent would receive a star on Canada's Walk of Fame.

On March 8, 2007, it was publicly announced in Toronto, Ontario, Canada, that Pinsent had accepted the appointment of honorary chairman of the "Building for the Future" fundraising campaign for The Royal Canadian Regiment Museum.

During the 2008, 2010, and 2011 summer periods of CBC Radio One, Pinsent presented a radio documentary series called The Late Show featuring extended obituaries of notable Canadians whom the producers believed deserved attention.

Pinsent appeared in one of Canadian director Stephen Dunn's early short films titled Life Doesn't Frighten Me, which won various awards, including the CBC Short Film Face-Off, with a cash prize of C$30,000. The film also won awards at the Toronto Student Film Festival and the Tribeca Film Festival in 2013.

He had a guest starring role as Maurice Becker on the February 3, 2010, episode of Canadian television series Republic of Doyle. He was also a featured guest reader on Bookaboo.

He attained notoriety when a comedic segment of him reading dramatically from Justin Bieber's autobiography on This Hour Has 22 Minutes went viral on October 20, 2010.

Writing
His first memoir, By the Way, was published in 1992 by Stoddart Publishing. His second, Next (with George Anthony), was published in 2012 by McClelland and Stewart.

He wrote several screenplays, including The Rowdyman and John and the Missus.

His plays include Easy Down Easy (1987) and Brass Rubbings (1989).

Personal life and death 
Pinsent married actress Charmion King in 1962. They remained together until her death in 2007. Their daughter, Leah Pinsent, is also an actress. Pinsent also has two children from a previous marriage and a son from another relationship.

On February 25, 2023, Pinsent died at a hospital in Toronto at age 92, from complications of a cerebral hemorrhage.

Awards
Pinsent was a companion of The Order of Canada and a Fellow of The Royal Society of Canada.

In 1997, he won the Earle Grey Award for lifetime achievement in television.

Pinsent received an LL.D from the University of Prince Edward Island in 1975, and honorary doctorates from Queen's University, Memorial University of Newfoundland, Lakehead University (2008) and the University of Windsor (2012).

Pinsent received a Governor General's Performing Arts Award in 2004, Canada's highest honour in the performing arts.

It was on July 12, 2005, in his hometown of Grand Falls-Windsor, and in honour of his 75th birthday, that the Arts & Culture Centre was renamed The Gordon Pinsent Centre for the Arts.

On September 25, 2008, at a "Newfoundland- and Labrador-Inspired Evening" at The Windsor Arms Hotel in Toronto, the Company Theatre presented Pinsent with the inaugural Gordon Pinsent Award of Excellence.

Pinsent received the Queen Elizabeth II Diamond Jubilee Medal in 2012.

Pinsent received acting and writing awards, which included five Gemini Awards, three Genie Awards, two ACTRA Awards, and a Dora Award.

Filmography

Movies

1964: Lydia as Thomas
1966: Don't Forget to Wipe the Blood Off
1968: The Thomas Crown Affair as Jamie McDonald
1970: Colossus: The Forbin Project as The President
1971: Chandler as John Melchior
1972: The Rowdyman as Will Cole
1972: Blacula as Lt. Jack Peters
1974: Newman's Law as Jack Eastman
1974: Only God Knows as Father John Hagan
1975: The Heatwave Lasted Four Days as Cliff Reynolds
1976: Blackwood as Narrator
1977: Who Has Seen the Wind as Gerald O'Connal
1980: Klondike Fever as Swiftwater Bill
1981: The Devil at Your Heels as narrator
1981: Silence of the North as John Frederickson
1987: John and the Missus as John Munn
1989: Babar: The Movie as King Babar (voice)
1990: Blood Clan as Judge William McKay
1997: Pippi Longstocking as Capt. Longstocking (voice)
1997: Pale Saints as Gus
1999: The Old Man and the Sea (Short) as Old Man (voice)
2001: The Shipping News as Billy Pretty
2002: A Promise (Short)
2003: Nothing as Man In Suit
2004: The Good Shepherd as Cardinal Ledesna
2004: Saint Ralph as Father Fitzpatrick
2006: Away from Her as Grant Anderson
2009: The Spine (Short) (voice)
2009: At Home by Myself...With You as Narrator (voice)
2012: Flight of the Butterflies
2013: Sex After Kids as Dr. Keaton
2013: The Grand Seduction as Simon
2013: Big News from Grand Rock as Stan
2016: Two Lovers and a Bear as Bear's Voice
2017: The River of My Dreams (Documentary)

Television series

1963: Scarlett Hill as David Black
1963–1965: The Forest Rangers as Sergeant Brian Scott
1968: Quentin Durgens, M.P. as Quentin Durgens
1970: Hogan's Heroes as Capt. Steiner
1972: Banacek as John Weymouth
1973: Cannon as Phillip Trask
1974: The Play's The Thing as Host
1978–1979: A Gift to Last
1980: Up at Ours
1983: Ready for Slaughter
1984: Seeing Things as Englander
1989–1991: Babar as King Babar
1989–1993:  Street Legal as Harold Vickers
1989: Friday the 13th: The Series as Desmond Williams
1991–2006: The Red Green Show as Hap Shaughnessy
1994–1999: Due South as Robert Fraser (recurring)
1997–2000: Wind at My Back as Leo McGinty
1998–2003: Made in Canada as Myron Kingswell / Walter Franklin, Sr.
1998–2000: Power Play as Duff McArdle
2004: H2O: The Last Prime Minister as Michael Cameron
2010: The Pillars of the Earth as Archbishop
2010–2012: Republic of Doyle as Maurice Becker (recurring)
2010–2015: Babar and the Adventures of Badou as King Babar
2013: Satisfaction as Dr Faskin
2019: Private Eyes as Nevin Ainslie

Television specials and movies
1973: Incident on a Dark Street as Joe – Mayor
1979: The Suicide's Wife as Allan Crane
1981: Escape from Iran: The Canadian Caper as Ambassador Ken Taylor
1982: The Life and Times of Edwin Alonzo Boyd as Edwin Alonzo Boyd
1984: A Case of Libel as Dennis Corcoran
1988: Two Men
1992: In the Eyes of the Stranger as Lt. Ted Burk
1993: Bonds of Love as Leon
1995: A Vow to Kill as Frank Waring
1999: Win, Again! as Win Morrissey
2001: Blind Terror as Martin Howell
2003: Hemingway vs Callaghan as Morley Callaghan
2003: Fallen Angel as Warren Wentworth
2012: Sunshine Sketches of a Little Town as Elder Stephen Leacock

Discography
Discography of Pinsent:
 2002: At the Rim of the Carol-Singing Sea (with The Newfoundland Symphony Youth Choir)
 2010: Down and Out in Upalong (with Travis Good and Greg Keelor)

References

External links

Northern Stars: Gordon Pinsent
 Gordon Pinsent at The Canadian Encyclopedia
 

1930 births
2023 deaths
20th-century Canadian dramatists and playwrights
20th-century Canadian male actors
20th-century Canadian male writers
21st-century Canadian male actors
21st-century Canadian male writers
Best Actor Genie and Canadian Screen Award winners
Best Supporting Actor Genie and Canadian Screen Award winners
Best Supporting Actor in a Drama Series Canadian Screen Award winners
Canadian Anglicans
Canadian male dramatists and playwrights
Canadian male film actors
Canadian male screenwriters
Canadian male stage actors
Canadian male television actors
Canadian male voice actors
Canadian military personnel from Newfoundland and Labrador
Canadian people of English descent
Companions of the Order of Canada
Deaths from intracranial haemorrhage
Fellows of the Royal Society of Canada
Film directors from Newfoundland and Labrador
Governor General's Performing Arts Award winners
Male actors from Newfoundland and Labrador
Neurological disease deaths in Ontario
People from Grand Falls-Windsor
Royal Canadian Regiment soldiers
Writers from Newfoundland and Labrador